The Bestival 2009 was the sixth installment of the Bestival, a boutique music festival held at Robin Hill on the Isle of Wight. The festival was held over the weekend between 11 September and 13 September 2009. Each year a fancy dress theme is announced, this year's being outer space with the title 'A Space Oddity'. The festival boasts its own radio station called Bestival Radio. The station is broadcast on-site, plays music and keeps listeners camping at the festival up-to-date on news and events over the weekend. Headline acts were announced as Massive Attack, Kraftwerk and Elbow.

Line-up
The main line-up for the event was as follows:

Main stage
Friday
Massive Attack
MGMT
Soulwax
Florence & the Machine
Friendly Fires
Passion Pit
65daysofstatic
The Acorn
Arcade Eden

Saturday
Kraftwerk
Klaxons
The Cuban Brothers
Seasick Steve
Lily Allen
The Correspondents
Mika
Little Boots
Beardyman
Goldie Lookin' Chain
Jaguar Skillz
Golden Silvers
Joe Gideon & the Shark

Sunday
Elbow
Fleet Foxes
English National Ballet
Doves
Björn Again
Kitty Daisy & Lewis
James Harwood, Fabio
Lendrum & Mike Cuban
Michael Nyman
Feeling Gloomy (DJ)
Music from the Penguin Cafe
The Low Anthem
Shanklin Freakshow

Big Top
Friday
Metronomy
2ManyDJs
Bat For Lashes
Frankmusik
Fabio & Grooverider

Saturday
King Roc
The Future Sound of London
DJ Yoda
La Roux
MDS Diplo
MDS Buraka
MDS Boy 8 Bit

Sunday
Carl Cox (Old Skool Set)
Squarepusher
The Field

Comedy
 Craig Campbell
 Jason John Whitehead
 Andrew Maxwell
 Fullmooners
 Abandoman
 Doc Brown
 Bob Slayer
 Tiffany Stephenson

References

External links
 Official Bestival website

Music festivals on the Isle of Wight
2009 in British music
2009 in England